Sir John Royden Maddox, FRS (27 November 1925 – 12 April 2009) was a Welsh theoretical chemist, turned physicist, and science writer. He was an editor of Nature for 22 years, from 1966 to 1973 and 1980 to 1995.

Education and early life
John Royden Maddox was born on 27 November 1925, at Penllergaer near Swansea, Wales. He was the son of Arthur Jack Maddox, a furnaceman at an aluminium plant. He was educated at Gowerton Boys' County School. From there, aged 15, he won a state scholarship to Christ Church, Oxford, where he read chemistry, and King's College London, where he studied physics.

Career
From 1949 to 1955 Maddox lectured in theoretical physics at the University of Manchester.

He then became the science correspondent at The Manchester Guardian, a post he held until 1964.

From 1964 to 1966 he was the coordinator of the Nuffield Science Teaching Project; after which he was appointed editor of Nature, a role he held from 1966 to 1973 (and 1980 to 1995).

He was director of the Nuffield Foundation from 1975 to 1979.

From 1980 to 1995 he was again editor of Nature. In 1990, he publicly investigated homoeopathy claims.

Sheldrake editorial, 1981
When the book A New Science of Life by British biologist Rupert Sheldrake was published in 1981, proposing the theory of morphic resonance instead of DNA as the basis for shapes and behaviour in nature, Maddox denounced it fiercely in an editorial titled "A book for burning?" in which he argued that Sheldrake's ideas were pseudoscience. Maddox concluded that the book should not be burned but placed "among the literature of intellectual aberrations". He elaborated in a 1994 BBC documentary on Sheldrake's theory:

Stance on AIDS denial
Maddox is remembered for his opposition to the notion that AIDS is not caused by the HIV virus. As editor of Nature, in 1993 Maddox decided not to publish the words of Peter Duesberg, who had claimed AIDS was caused by drugs, because in Maddox's view the stakes were too high for such a prestigious journal to disseminate discredited views.

Stance on the Big Bang
In the late 1980s, as evidence for the Big Bang origin of the Universe accumulated, Maddox, who favoured the Steady State theory, penned an editorial denouncing the theory as "philosophically unacceptable" (because he saw it giving a foothold to Creationists) and "over-simplistic" and he predicted its demise within a decade (when results from the Hubble Space Telescope would become available).

Publications
Maddox authored and edited numerous publications including: 
 Beyond the Energy Crisis
 Revolution in Biology
 The Doomsday Syndrome
 What Remains to Be Discovered: Mapping the Secrets of the Universe, the Origins of Life, and the Future of the Human Race.

Honours and awards
In 1995 Maddox was knighted. In 2000 he was made an honorary Fellow of the Royal Society.  His nomination read:

The John Maddox Prize is named in his honour. The prize is awarded to people who have stood up for science, despite facing difficulty and opposition.  He was a Distinguished Supporter of the British Humanist Association, and a trustee of Sense about Science. In 1994 the Committee for Skeptical Inquiry (CSICOP) presented Maddox the Public Education in Science Award. 

In April 2011, the executive council of the Committee for Skeptical Inquiry (CSI, formerly CSICOP) selected Maddox for inclusion in CSI's Pantheon of Skeptics.  The Pantheon of Skeptics was created by CSI to remember the legacy of deceased fellows of CSI and their contributions to the cause of scientific skepticism.

Personal life
Maddox lived in London, and spent time at his cottage near Brecon in Wales, where he and his wife, Brenda Maddox, were involved in the local community. They had two children, Bronwen and Bruno Maddox. He had two previous children with Nancy Fanning King (Piers Maddox and Joanna Maddox), and two children with Lois Barton (Lois Wheatley and Adrian Maddox).

References

Academic journal editors
Academics of the University of Manchester
Alumni of Christ Church, Oxford
Alumni of King's College London
Fellows of King's College London
The Guardian journalists
Honorary Fellows of the Royal Society
Knights Bachelor
People from Swansea
Place of death missing
British chemists
British physicists
British science writers
Welsh chemists
Welsh physicists
Welsh science writers
Welsh humanists
1925 births
2009 deaths
People educated at Gowerton Grammar School
British sceptics
Nature (journal) editors